Hemitrygon yemenensis is a species of stingray in the family Dasyatidae.

Hemitrygon yemenensis is found along the Arabian Sea coast of eastern Yemen.

References

Hemitrygon
Taxa named by Alec B. M. Moore
Taxa named by Peter R. Last
Taxa named by Gavin J.P. Naylor
Fish described in 2020